German submarine U-293 was a Type VIIC/41 U-boat of Nazi Germany's Kriegsmarine during World War II. She was laid down on 17 November 1942 by the Bremer Vulkan Werft (yard) at Bremen-Vegesack as yard number 58, launched on 30 July 1943, and commissioned on 8 September with Kapitänleutnant Leonhard Klingspor in command. In six patrols, she damaged one warship. She surrendered at Loch Eriboll in Scotland on 11 May 1945 and was sunk as part of Operation Deadlight on 13 December 1945.

Design

German Type VIIC/41 submarines were preceded by the shorter Type VIIB submarines. U-293 had a displacement of  when at the surface and  while submerged. She had two shafts and two  propellers.

U-293 was fitted with five  torpedo tubes (four fitted at the bow and one at the stern), fourteen torpedoes, one  SK C/35 naval gun, (220 rounds), one  Flak M42 and two  C/30 anti-aircraft guns. The boat had a complement of between forty-four and sixty.

Service history

U-293 was ordered by Kriegsmarine on 14 October 1941. She was laid down just over one year later at Bremer Vulkan, Bremen-Vegesack on 17 November 1942. U-293 was launched from Bremen-Vegesack on 30 July 1943. She was formally commissioned later that year on 8 September 1943. Like all Type VIIC/41 U-boats, U-293 carried five  torpedo tubes (4 located in the bow, 1 in the stern) and had one C35 88mm/L45 deck gun with 220 rounds of ammunition. She could also carry 14 G7e torpedoes or 26 TMA mines and could hold a crew of 44-52 men.

First Patrol
After her training with the 8th U-boat flotilla, U-293 traveled through German controlled waters for several months, eventually being stationed in Trondheim, after stops at bases such as Arendal, Bergen, and Stavanger. After over a year since being formally commissioned into Kriegsmarine, U-293 began her first wartime patrol under the command of Oblt. Leonhard Klingspor on 16 September 1944. For seven days, U-293 traveled through the Norwegian Sea until arriving at the port of Narvik on 22 September 1944. During this time, U-293 sighted no enemy vessels.

Second, Third, and Fourth Patrols
Again under the command of Klingspor, U-293 departed from Narvik on 25 September 1944 and ventured out into the Arctic Ocean. During this 10-day patrol, U-293 again failed to encounter any enemy vessels of any type. On 4 October 1944, U-293 ended her second war patrol by arriving at the port city of Hammerfest, one of the most extreme northern German U-boat bases in Norway.

U-293s third patrol proved to be the longest one that the U-boat had undertaken up to that point. On 14 October 1944, after spending four days in port, the U-boat left Hammerfest and traveled into the Barents Sea off the north coast of Russia. During the 24-day period, the U-boat once again failed to make contact with any enemy vessels and once again returned to Narvik on 6 November 1944.

U-293s fourth patrol was much like her third. During 29 days at sea, the U-boat traveled to the northern coast of Russia, failed encounter any ships, and once again returned to Narvik on 19 December 1944, having left on 21 November 1944. After this patrol, the U-boat was put under the command of Oblt. Erich Steinbrink.

Fifth Patrol
With Steinbrink in command, U-293 departed Narvik on 1 January 1945. In what was to be the longest patrol conducted in U-293s history, the U-boat once again traveled into the Arctic off of the northern coast of Russia. It was here on 20 January 1945 that U-293 scored her first and only hit of the war. At 10:55 AM local time, the Soviet Destroyer Razyaryonny was escorting the convoy "KP-1" and was attempting to hunt down the U-boat along with another ship, Razumny, when she was hit by a torpedo launched from U-293. Razyaryonny was traveling at 16 knots when she was hit in the afterpart. Part of Razyaryonnys stern was lost in the explosion. Despite the attack, her crew managed to save the ship and was later towed by the Soviet minesweeper T-117 to the port of Liinahamari on 21 January 1945. After this attack, U-293 returned to Narvik on 15 February 1945, after spending 46 days at sea.

Summary of raiding history

See also
 Battle of the Atlantic (1939-1945)

References

Notes

Citations

Bibliography

External links

German Type VIIC/41 submarines
U-boats commissioned in 1943
1943 ships
World War II submarines of Germany
Ships built in Bremen (state)
Operation Deadlight
U-boats sunk in 1945
U-boats sunk by British warships
Maritime incidents in December 1945